Wang Qian (born 30 June 1993) is a Chinese sport shooter.

She participated at the 2018 ISSF World Shooting Championships.

References

External links

1993 births
Chinese female sport shooters
Living people
ISSF pistol shooters
Shooters at the 2018 Asian Games
Medalists at the 2018 Asian Games
Asian Games gold medalists for China
Asian Games medalists in shooting
Shooters at the 2020 Summer Olympics